I Kid with Brad Garrett is an American TV show starring  Brad Garrett.

The show premiered on Tuesday June 28, 2011 and ran for 12 episodes. The host Garrett gets children's responses to odd questions and situations.

References

External links 

 TLC Videos
 Facebook page

2011 American television series debuts
2010s American reality television series
TLC (TV network) original programming
2011 American television series endings
Television series about children